Yuraq Ñan (Quechua yuraq white, ñan road, "white road", also spelled Yuracñan) is a mountain in the Cordillera Central in the Andes of Peru which reaches a height of approximately . It is located in the Lima Region, Yauyos Province, Huancaya District. Yuraq Ñan lies west of Sankha Ukru.

References 

Mountains of Peru
Mountains of Lima Region